Rajella is a genus of skate found deeper than  in the Pacific, Atlantic and Indian oceans.

Species
There are currently 18 recognized species in this genus: 
 Rajella annandalei M. C. W. Weber, 1913 (Annandale's skate)
 Rajella barnardi Norman, 1935 (Bigthorn skate)
 Rajella bathyphila Holt & Byrne, 1908 (Deep-water ray)
 Rajella bigelowi Stehmann, 1978 (Bigelow's ray)
 Rajella caudaspinosa von Bonde & Swart, 1923 (Munchkin skate)
 Rajella challengeri Last & Stehmann, 2008 (Challenger skate)
 Rajella dissimilis Hulley, 1970 (Ghost skate)
 Rajella eisenhardti Long & McCosker, 1999 (Galápagos grey skate)
 Rajella fuliginea Bigelow & Schroeder, 1954 (Sooty skate)
 Rajella fyllae Lütken, 1887 (Round ray)
 Rajella kukujevi Dolganov, 1985 (Mid-Atlantic skate)
 Rajella leopardus von Bonde & Swart, 1923 (Leopard skate)
 Rajella lintea Fries, 1838 (Sailray)
 Rajella nigerrima F. de Buen, 1960 (Blackish skate)
 Rajella paucispinosa Weigmann, Stehmann & Thiel, 2014 (Sparsely-thorned skate) 
 Rajella purpuriventralis Bigelow & Schroeder, 1962 (Purplebelly skate)
 Rajella ravidula Hulley, 1970 (Smoothback skate)
 Rajella sadowskii G. Krefft & Stehmann, 1974 (Brazilian skate)

References 

 
Rajidae
Ray genera
Taxonomy articles created by Polbot